Phil Phelps (born May 1, 1979) is a Democratic member of the Michigan House of Representatives, elected in a special election in 2013 to replace Jim Ananich after he resigned his seat to replace John J. Gleason who was elected clerk of Genesee County in 2012.

Political life
Previous political positions held was as special advisor to House Democratic Leader Richard Hammel and in 2013 chief of staff for incoming State Representative Pam Faris.

Electoral history

References

1979 births
Living people
Politicians from Flint, Michigan
Democratic Party members of the Michigan House of Representatives
University of Michigan–Flint alumni
21st-century American politicians